The Sagas of Veluwe are collection of Dutch fairy tales from Eastern Netherlands, particularly in the Province of Gelderland in Veluwe. They were collected by :nl:Gustaaf Frederik van de Wall Perné. He published these tales in two volumes:

Volume 1
The first volume of the Veluwsche Sagen contains fourteen fairy tales:

 De Groote en de Kleine Hul
 Ontstaan van het Uddeler- en Bleeke meer 
 Een sprookje van Pomphul
 De witte juffer van Hoog Soeren
 Van d'Aard-Mansberg en d'Echoput
 De wilde jacht
 Wichard Sage
 De zwarte vrouw van Starveren
 Legende van het Solsche gat
 De Rookberg of Buntermansberg te Nunspeet
 Het Ruitergat
 Het Spook bij het Solsche gat
 De Hooge Duvel en de Rooie Heg
 Om den Heerd

Volume 2
The second volume  of the Veluwsche Sagen contains eight fairy tales:  
 De Boomen van Drie
 Hoe de Gruwel aan zijn paard kwam'''
 Veurgezicht De Juffer van Kwoadenoord Toen de Schipper door den Booze gehaald werd De Toovenaar en de Schipper Bia's Bruidsvaart De Woeste Hoeve''

References
 Biography of Gustaaf Frederik Van de Wall Perné

External links
 The Origins of the Uddelermeer and the Bleeke Meer Translated into English by Arthur Koopmans
 Ontstaan van het Uddeler- en Bleeke meer Translated into English by Eva Weggelaar
 Een sprookje van Pomphul Translated into English by Eva Weggelaar
 De Groote en de Kleine Hul Translated into English by Eva Weggelaar

Sagas of Veluwe
Culture of Gelderland
Dutch books
Dutch folklore